Miguel Pacheco (5 September 1931 – 17 February 2018) was a Spanish racing cyclist. In 1959 he won the Vuelta a Andalucía.

Major results

1955
 1st Stage 5 Volta a Catalunya
1956
 1st Stage 8 Vuelta a Asturias
1958
 1st Stage 1 Vuelta a España
1959
 1st  Overall Vuelta a Andalucía
 1st Campeonato Vasco-Navarro de Montaña
 3rd GP Pascuas
 3rd Trofeo Masferrer
1960
 3rd Overall Vuelta a España
1st Stage 1 (TTT)
1962
 1st Stage 3b Volta a Catalunya
 4th Overall Vuelta a España
1963
 2nd National Road Race Championships
 3rd Overall Vuelta a España
1st Stage 12b

References

External links
 

1931 births
2018 deaths
Spanish male cyclists
Sportspeople from Sabadell
Spanish Vuelta a España stage winners
Cyclists from Catalonia
20th-century Spanish people